The 2020–21 Purdue Boilermakers women's basketball team represented Purdue University during the 2020–21 NCAA Division I women's basketball season. The Boilermakers, led by 15th year head coach Sharon Versyp, played their home games at Mackey Arena and were a members of the Big Ten Conference.

They finished the season 7–16 and 4–14 in Big Ten play to finish in twelfth place.  As the eleventh seed in the Big Ten tournament, they were defeated by Iowa in the Second Round.  They were not invited to the NCAA tournament or the WNIT.

Previous season
The Boilermakers finished the season with a record of 18–14, 8–10 in Big Ten play to finish in ninth place. As the ninth seed in the Big Ten women's tournament they defeated Michigan State in the Second Round before losing to Maryland in the Quarterfinals.  The NCAA tournament and WNIT were cancelled due to the COVID-19 outbreak.

Roster

Schedule

Source:

|-
!colspan=6 style=| Non-conference regular season

|-
!colspan=6 style=| Big Ten conference season

|-
!colspan=6 style=| Big Ten Women's Tournament

Rankings

The Coaches Poll did not release a Week 2 poll and the AP Poll did not release a poll after the NCAA Tournament.

See also
2020–21 Purdue Boilermakers men's basketball team

References

Purdue Boilermakers women's basketball seasons
Purdue
Purdue
Purdue